Zilch (stylized as zilch or ) was a rock supergroup that was formed in 1996 by Hideto "hide" Matsumoto (X Japan), Ray McVeigh (formerly of The Professionals), Paul Raven (Killing Joke), Joey Castillo (Danzig and Queens of the Stone Age) and Kazuhiko "I.N.A." Inada (hide with Spread Beaver).

Before the release of their first album, 3.2.1., the group had already faced a major setback, as frontman hide died in May 1998. The band continued to perform live with the help of several guest musicians and released a remix album, Bastard Eyes, based on their debut. They went on to release another studio album, SkyJin, and two singles, "Mimizuzero" and "Charlie's Children."

Zilch disbanded in 2002, and Raven died in 2007.

Members 
 Hideto "hide" Matsumoto – lead guitar, lead vocals
 Ray McVeigh – rhythm guitar, co-lead vocals
 Paul Raven – bass, backing vocals
 Joey Castillo – drums
 I.N.A. – programming

Guest musicians
 Ian Astbury – vocals
 Jaz Coleman – vocals
 James Hall – vocals
 MC Shabba D – rap
 Ol' Dirty Bastard – rap
 Sen Dog – rap
 Mellow Man Ace – rap
 Kool Keith – rap
 Steve Jones – guitar
 Jerry Cantrell – guitar
 Geordie Walker – guitar
 Dave Kushner – guitar
 Brian Robertson – guitar
 Todd Youth – guitars
 J – bass
 Duff McKagan – bass
 Sean Yseult – bass
 Scott Garrett – drums
 Matt Walker – drums
 Chris Vrenna – drums
 Charlie Clouser – synth, programming
 DJ Swamp – DJ
 Shaun Ryder – singer – vocals
 Hisashi Imai – guitar
 Maki Fuji – guitar
 Sugizo – guitar
 Yvette Lera – vocals

Discography 
 3.2.1. (July 23, 1998), Oricon peak position: No. 2
 Bastard Eyes (March 3, 1999, remix album) No. 5
 "Mimizuzero" (February 28, 2001) No. 37
 "Charlie's Children" (June 27, 2001) No. 37
 Skyjin (September 27, 2001) No. 33

 Appears on
 Heavy Metal 2000 (April 18, 2000, "Inside the Pervert Mound")
 Cafe Le Psyence -hide Lemoned Compilation- (May 16, 2002, "Electric Cucumber")
 Catacombs (October 3, 2007, "Psyche")

References

External links 
 

American alternative metal musical groups
American industrial music groups
Musical groups established in 1996
Musical groups disestablished in 2002
Industrial rock musical groups